Charuymaq-e Shomalesharqi Rural District is in the Central District of Hashtrud County, East Azerbaijan province, Iran. At the National Census of 2006, its population was 1,445 in 308 households. There were 1,327 inhabitants in 366 households at the following census of 2011. At the most recent census of 2016, the population of the rural district was 1,141 in 384 households. The largest of its 18 villages was Nasirabad-e Sofla, with 542 people.

References 

Hashtrud County

Rural Districts of East Azerbaijan Province

Populated places in East Azerbaijan Province

Populated places in Hashtrud County